Orsamus Cook Merrill (June 18, 1775April 12, 1865) was a U.S. Representative from Vermont.

Early life
Merrill was born in Farmington in the Connecticut Colony to James and Jerusha Seymour Merrill. He completed his preparatory studies in Farmington, and moved to Bennington, Vermont in 1791 where he was an apprentice to a printer. He was an editor or publisher of several newspapers, including the "Vermont Gazette" and the "Tablet of the Times" in Bennington, and the "Berkshire Gazette" in Pittsfield, Massachusetts.

He later studied law, was admitted to the bar in 1805, and practiced in Bennington.

From 1809 to 1812 he was Postmaster of Bennington.

In the early 1800s he also served as Engrossing Clerk of the Vermont House of Representatives.

War of 1812
He served in upstate New York and Vermont during the War of 1812 as a Major of the 11th Infantry Regiment, and a Lieutenant Colonel in the 26th Infantry and 11th Infantry.

When Merrill received promotion to lieutenant colonel in the 26th Infantry, his replacement as major in the 11th was Zachary Taylor, who was promoted from captain in the 7th Infantry.

Post-war life
Merrill became Register of Probate for Bennington County in 1815 and served as Clerk of the Courts in 1816.

Merrill was elected as a Democratic-Republican candidate to the Fifteenth Congress, serving from March 4, 1817 until March 3, 1819.  He presented credentials as a Member-elect to the Sixteenth Congress and served from March 4, 1819 until January 12, 1820, when he was succeeded by Rollin C. Mallary, who successfully contested the election.

Later life
Merrill lost elections for Congress in 1822, 1826, 1827, 1830, 1832, and 1833, evidence that Vermont was trending away from Democrats and towards, in succession, the Anti-Masons, Whigs and Republicans.

In 1822 Merrill served as a delegate to the State constitutional convention.

He served in the Vermont House of Representatives from 1822 to 1823 and from 1841 to 1847 he was county Judge of Probate.

He was Bennington County's State's Attorney from 1823 to 1825, a member of the Governor's Council from 1824 until 1827, and a member of the first Vermont State Senate after the body was created in 1836.

In 1839 he ran unsuccessfully for lieutenant governor.

Family
Merrill married Mary Robinson on August 18, 1805 and they had three children. Mary Robinson was the daughter of Jonathan Robinson.

O.C. Merrill's brother Timothy served as Vermont Secretary of State from 1831 to 1836.  His nephew Farrand F. Merrill (son of Timothy) served as Secretary of State from 1849 to 1853.

Death
Merrill died in Bennington on April 12, 1865, and is interred in the Old Cemetery on Bennington Hill in Bennington, Vermont.

References

Further reading
 "The Disputed Congressional Election of 1818," Vermont History 49 (Summer 1981): 159-68.

External links
 
 Biographical Directory of the United States Congress
 
 govtrack.us: Rep. Orsamus Merrill
 The York Times: Obituary for Honorable O.C.Merrill

1775 births
1865 deaths
People from Bennington, Vermont
19th-century American newspaper publishers (people)
Vermont lawyers
State's attorneys in Vermont
Vermont postmasters
Vermont state court judges
Members of the Vermont House of Representatives
Vermont state senators
United States Army personnel of the War of 1812
United States Army officers
Burials in Vermont
Democratic-Republican Party members of the United States House of Representatives from Vermont
19th-century American lawyers
Members of the United States House of Representatives removed by contest